Batken International Airport (Kyrgyz: Баткен эл аралык аэропорту, Russian: Баткенский международный аэропорт)  is an international airport serving Batken, the capital of Batken Province (oblast) of Kyrgyzstan. The Russian IATA code for Batken Airport is БАТ.

Batken International Airport started its operations in 1958 as a landing strip. The current runway and terminal were built in 1984. It is a class 3C airport. The runway has a weight limit of 22 tonnes, and has no instrument landing facilities, operating only during daylight hours.

Batken Airport was given international status on April 19, 2014. Customs and border control checks will be installed and the current runway will be extended by 400 meters. There are occasional flights to Osh, Jalal-Abad and even to nearby Isfana.

Airlines and destinations

References

External links 
OurAirports.com

Airports in Kyrgyzstan
Airports built in the Soviet Union